Trilocha guianensis is a moth in the family Bombycidae. It was described by Paul Thiaucourt in 2009. It is found in French Guiana.

References

Bombycidae
Moths described in 2009